Cerynea ustula is a moth of the family Erebidae first described by George Hampson in 1897. It is found in Sri Lanka and the Andaman Islands.

References

Moths of Asia
Moths described in 1897
Boletobiinae